Nevado Pastoruri is a mountain in central Peru located in the center of Pachapaqui, in the Aquia District, in the Bolognesi Province in the Ancash Region. It is located in the Cordillera Blanca, a mountainous chain that forms part of the Cordillera Occidental of the Peruvian Andes.

References

Mountains of Ancash Region
Mountains of Peru